Gretel Bolliger (3 December 1921 – 20 July 2009) was a Swiss athlete. She competed in four track and field events at the 1952 Summer Olympics.

References

1921 births
2009 deaths
Athletes (track and field) at the 1952 Summer Olympics
Swiss female hurdlers
Swiss female long jumpers
Swiss female shot putters
Swiss female discus throwers
Olympic athletes of Switzerland
Place of birth missing